Chicago style may refer to several things:

The Chicago Manual of Style, a guideline for writing documents and news reports
Chicago school (architecture), a style of commercial buildings
Chicago school of economics, a school of thought among economists and academics
Chicago blues, a genre of blues music
Chicago-style dixieland, a genre of jazz music
Chicago-style pizza, several varieties of pizza
Chicago-style hot dog, an ingredient-laden variety of hot dog

See also
Chicago school (disambiguation) several theories of thought